The New Encyclopedia of Islam is a revised edition of the Concise Encyclopedia of Islam by Cyril Glassé, published in 1989 (2nd ed. 1991, revised ed. 2001) with Stacey International and AltaMira Press. 

It is not to be confused with the  Encyclopaedia of Islam.

References

External links

1989 non-fiction books